The AIR Awards of 2018 is the twelfth annual Australian Independent Record Labels Association Music Awards (generally known as the AIR Awards) and was an award ceremony at Queen's Theatre Adelaide, Australia on Thursday 26 July 2017.

In 2018, the Outstanding Achievement Award was introduced. The award recognises an individual or group who has made a significant and lasting contribution to the Australian Independent Music Community.

In an AIR Awards first, the award for Best Independent Album or EP was a tie this year, with both Methyl Ethel and The Jungle Giants being announced as winners.

Following the awards, AIR general manager, Maria Amato said "It was great to celebrate the success of the Australian Independent music sector at the 2018 AIR Awards in Adelaide last night. We are grateful to the South Australian Government for their continued support and to all our valued partners who helped us make it all happen."

Performers
Alex the Astronaut – "Not Worth Hiding"
Bad//Dreems – "Feeling Remains"
Baker Boy – "Mr La Di Da Di"
Caiti Baker – "I Won't Sleep"
Fanny Lumsden – "Elastic Waistband"
Stella Donnelly – "Boys Will Be Boys"

Outstanding Achievement Award
Skinny Fish Music

Nominees and winners

AIR Awards
Winners are listed first and highlighted in boldface; other final nominees are listed alphabetically.

See also
Music of Australia

References

2018 in Australian music
2018 music awards
AIR Awards